37 Comae Berenices is a variable star system located around 690 light years away from the Sun in the northern constellation of Coma Berenices. It has the variable star designation LU Comae Berenices. 37 Comae Berenices was a later Flamsteed designation of 13 Canum Venaticorum. This object is visible to the naked eye as a faint, yellow-hued star with a baseline apparent visual magnitude of 4.88. It is drifting closer to the Earth with a heliocentric radial velocity of −14 km/s.

Tokovinin (2008) catalogued this as a wide triple star system. It is a weak G-band star, a luminous giant star with a carbon abundance about a factor of 5 lower than is typical for such stars. This is a variable star most likely of the RS CVn type with an amplitude of 0.15 in magnitude, and it displays magnetic activity. It has 5.25 times the mass of the Sun and, having exhausted the supply of hydrogen at its core, has expanded to 38 times the Sun's radius.

References

G-type giants
RS Canum Venaticorum variables
Triple star systems

Coma Berenices
BD+31 2434
Comae Berenices, 37
112989
063462
4924
Comae Berenices, LU